Rough Dreams is an album by Shivaree, released by Odeon Records in 2002. Due to disputes with the label, Rough Dreams was not officially released in the United States.

Track listing
 "Wagers"
 "Gone Too Far"
 "After The Prince And The Showgirl"
 "All Because You Told Me So"
 "Thundercats"
 "Snake Eyes"
 "Stealing Home"
 "John, 2/14"
 "Reseda Casino"
 "Ten Minutes"
 "Queen-Sized Tomb"
 "Flycatcher"

Personnel
 Ambrosia Parsley – Vocals
 Duke McVinnie – Guitar
 Danny McGough – Keyboards

Chart performance

References 

Shivaree (band) albums
2002 albums